The E-Z Rollers are a British drum and bass group. The group was formed in 1995 in Suffolk, England.

E-Z Rollers began releasing output on the Moving Shadow label, but later created their own label called Intercom Recordings. In 2007, they released the album, Conductor.

History
One of their first hits was "Rolled into 1", and other tracks included: their single "Short Change" which was a part of Grand Theft Auto 2s soundtrack by Rockstar Games; "Cop Theme" which was a part of the Sled Storm soundtrack; The Origin Unknown remix of "Tough at the Top"; "Soundclash" part of the Rollcage soundtrack, and "Breakbeat Generation" which can be heard in the introduction of Rollcage Stage II. Their song "Walk This Land" was heard in the film, Lock, Stock and Two Smoking Barrels. The track peaked at #18 in the UK Singles Chart in April 1999. Their songs "Retro" and "Soundclash" can also be heard on the video game TOCA 2 Touring Cars by Codemasters.

Discography

Studio albums
 Dimensions of Sound (1996)
 Weekend World (1998)
 Titles of the Unexpected (2002)
 Conductor (2007)

Mix albums
 Drumfunk Hooliganz (1998)
 Lickable Beats (2003)
 Lickable Beats 2 (2005)
 05.1 (2005)

References

External links
 
 Official myspace
 EZ Rollers 2007 review at BBC Norfolk
 E-Z Rollers Interview - October 2003
 E-Z Rollers Exclusive Interview

British drum and bass music groups
English dance music groups